Ángel Ramón Santos Berrios (born August 14, 1979) is a former Major League Baseball second baseman who played with the Boston Red Sox in 2001 and Cleveland Indians in 2003. Santos Berrios was arrested in October 16, 2012 and charged with drug trafficking and being part of a criminal organization.

External links

1979 births
Cleveland Indians players
Boston Red Sox players
Living people
Major League Baseball second basemen
Major League Baseball players from Puerto Rico
Buffalo Bisons (minor league) players
People from Río Piedras, Puerto Rico